The Golden Jury Film Festival is a film festival in India, that is held annually in Mumbai.

History 
Golden Jury Film Festival was founded by Pragyesh Singh. The first edition of the Golden Jury Film Festival was held in Mumbai, India in 2019.

2019 Festival 
It was a two-day film festival that was held in Andheri, Mumbai, on December 17–18, under the Golden Jury Film Academy's banner, whose program director was cinematographer Shubhranshu Das. The film festival had entries of 117 films, of which 15 films were screened and awards were distributed in 16 categories.

The competition winners in 2019 included Forbidden Tikka Masala  (Best Film), Naseeruddin Shah (Best Actor), Navni Parihar (Best Actress), Bhoomika Meena (Best Actress), Neena Gupta (Special Jury), Neeraj Yadav (Best Director) and Resul Pookutty (Best Sound Designing).

The following film and TV personalities participated in the 1st edition:

 Amrit Gangar
 Inamul Haque
 Bidita Bag
 Vikram Kochhar
 Vikas Khanna
 Nitin Kakkar
 Karthik Krishnan
 Sagar Sarhadi
 Major Bikramjeet Kanwarpal
 Rahul Bose
 Anjali Patil
 Sunil Pal
 Gadadhar Puty
 Ashok Purang
 Sandeep Nath.

2020 Festival 
The second edition of the Golden Jury Film Festival was held in December 2020. It began on 14 December and conclude on December 16. The  Golden Jury Film Festival 2020 was launched by actor Vinay Pathak and Sharib Hashmi. The festival showcased 40 films out of 520 entries. Actor Rahul Bose, Nitin Kakkar, Bidita Bag, Inaamulhaq, Vikram Kochhar and Anjali Patil were guests at the festival while its jury members were Smita Jayakar, Shishir Sharma, Ashok Purang, Sandeep Nath and Gadadhar Putty.

Awards 
2019

2020

See also 

 List of film festivals
 List of film festivals in India

References

External links

Film festivals in India
Film festivals established in 2019
2019 establishments in India
Annual events in India